The Hartford and New Haven Railroad (H&NH), chartered in 1833, was the first railroad built in the state of Connecticut and an important direct predecessor of the New York, New Haven and Hartford Railroad (the New Haven). The company was formed to connect the cities of New Haven, Connecticut, and Springfield, Massachusetts. It built northwards from New Haven, opening its first segment in 1838, and reaching Hartford in December 1839. The company reached Springfield in 1844 under the auspices of the Hartford and Springfield Railroad, a subsidiary chartered in Massachusetts. Branches were later built to Suffield, New Britain, and Middletown and operated by the Hartford and New Haven. The H&NH merged with the New York and New Haven Railroad in 1872, forming the New York, New Haven and Hartford Railroad.

The Hartford and New Haven Railroad's lines were merged into Penn Central Transportation Company with the rest of the bankrupt New Haven Railroad at the end of 1968; Penn Central itself went bankrupt and was merged into government-formed Conrail in 1976. At that time, Amtrak purchased the main line for passenger operations as its New Haven–Springfield Line, with Conrail handling freight operations and the various branches. Conrail sold its freight rights to the Connecticut Southern Railroad in 1996. Following track improvements and construction in the 2010s, in 2018 enhanced commuter rail service commenced, operated jointly by Amtrak and CT Rail.

History

Formation and construction 
The Hartford and New Haven Railroad of Connecticut was chartered in 1833 to build a railroad between Hartford and New Haven. It was one of the earliest railroads built in Connecticut, and was intended both to improve New Haven's access to the interior of the state, and to provide an alternative to ship transport along the Connecticut River, which froze during the winter. Alexander Catlin Twining was commissioned to survey the railroad's route, originally intended to pass through Middletown, Connecticut. However, Twining decided during his survey that building through the hilly terrain around Middletown would be too difficult, and instead chose an alignment further west, via Meriden, Connecticut. The citizens of Middletown were unhappy about being bypassed, but they would have to wait for more than a decade before a branch line reached their city.

Construction started from New Haven in 1836, with a temporary halt caused by the Panic of 1837. The first portion of the line, from New Haven to Meriden, saw its first trains in December 1838, while the rest of the line to Hartford opened in December of the following year. When the first portion of the line opened in December 1838, it was the first railroad to operate in the state of Connecticut. With the railroad's two namesake cities now connected, the company turned its attention northward to Springfield, Massachusetts. In that city, the Hartford and New Haven would be able to connect with the Western Railroad, which was building its own line from Boston to Springfield. 

As the company's original charter only authorized a railroad between Hartford and New Haven, new charters from the states of Connecticut and Massachusetts were requested by the railroad company. On April 4, 1839, the Massachusetts legislature granted a charter for the Hartford and Springfield Railroad, which was authorized to build from the Connecticut border to Springfield. The new railroad company never operated independently, as it was simply a vehicle for the Hartford and New Haven to extend its line into Massachusetts. Construction began in 1842, and the first trains between Hartford and Springfield ran at the end of 1844. The complete route was 62 miles (100 km) in length.

Operations 

In 1845, the Hartford and New Haven merged with the Hartford and Springfield Railroad to form the New Haven, Hartford and Springfield Railroad. The company reverted back to the Hartford and New Haven Railroad name in 1847.

The Hartford Weekly Times asserted that "This is the quickest trip ever made in this country with a heavy train over any railroad, and the road is now regularly run with greater speed than any other railroad in the United States, and with double the average velocity of railroads out of New England." The railroad's largely straight alignment, which followed natural topography and the Connecticut River, made this possible.

New York, New Haven and Hartford 
The Hartford and New Haven merged with the New York and New Haven Railroad in 1872, forming the New York, New Haven and Hartford Railroad (the New Haven). For the next 90 years, the route remained a vital passenger and freight route for the New Haven, with continuous passenger service even as most other lines in the region gradually had passenger service discontinued from the 1920s onward.

Penn Central and Amtrak purchase 
The New Haven era came to an end in 1969, when the company was merged into the Penn Central Transportation Company. National passenger rail carrier Amtrak, formed in 1971, purchased the Hartford and New Haven route outright in 1976, becoming its New Haven–Springfield Line. Freight service passed to newly-formed Conrail that same year.

Conrail and Amtrak 
From 1976 onwards, Amtrak maintained passenger service on the line, one of the few in the country it directly owned. Shuttle trains ran between New Haven and Springfield, and the line was also host to Amtrak's Bay State, a train between New York City and Boston via Springfield, as well as the Montrealer, travelling between New York City and Montreal. In the early 1990s, Amtrak elected to remove one of the two tracks on the line in a bid to reduce maintenance costs, a decision the company would come to regret in the 21st century when Connecticut and Massachusetts began a project to increase train service on the line.

Connecticut Southern and the Hartford Line 
Conrail transferred its operations on the New Haven-Springfield line to shortline railroad startup Connecticut Southern Railroad in 1996. The new freight operator began to improve freight service on the line, reversing a general decline in business during Conrail's tenure.

By the mid to late 2000s, Connecticut and Massachusetts were both advocating for improvements and expansion of commuter service on the line, at that point consisting solely of Amtrak's New Haven-Springfield Shuttle, offering six trains each direction daily. Plans for expansion culminated in the Hartford Line, a joint project between both states to restore double track to the line and significantly increase passenger rail service. Construction on the project began in 2015, and it opened for service in 2018. After completion, service was increased to 29 trains a day, with 17 being a short turn between New Haven and Hartford.

Branches 

In total, four branches were built off of the main line by other companies, all of which were quickly acquired by the Hartford and New Haven after completion. The addition of these branches brought the Hartford and New Haven's total mileage to 79 miles (127 km).

Middletown Railroad 
Middletown was initially planned to be directly served by the Hartford and New Haven, but was bypassed. In 1844, a number of residents of the city took the matter into their own hands by forming the Middletown Railroad, which in 1848 built a 9 mile (14 km) long railroad line between Middletown and the Hartford and New Haven main line at Berlin. The Middletown Railroad was purchased by the Hartford and New Haven in 1850.

An extension of the Middletown Railroad, appropriately named the Middletown Extension Railroad, was chartered in 1857 to connect Middletown and the Connecticut River. The railroad was built in 1860, and merged into the Hartford and New Haven in 1861.

Branch Company 
In 1845, interests in Hartford formed the Branch Company, which built a short spur from the Hartford and New Haven main line in Hartford, to the banks of the Connecticut River. The Hartford and New Haven absorbed the Branch Company in 1850.

New Britain and Middletown Railroad 
New Britain was another city bypassed by the original Hartford and New Haven main line. Much like in Middletown, in 1852 citizens there chartered the New Britain and Middletown Railroad, which built a 2 mile (3.2 km) long branch connecting their city to Berlin in 1865. This short railroad contracted out train operations to the Hartford and New Haven, before the latter company purchased it outright in 1868.

Windsor Locks and Suffield Railroad 
Formed in 1868, the Windsor Locks and Suffield Railroad built a 5 mile (8 km) long branch between Suffield and the Hartford and New Haven main line at Windsor Locks in 1870. Upon the completion of construction and the railroad's opening on December 12, 1870, it was operated by the Hartford and New Haven, and was formally merged into that company in 1871.

See also

List of New York, New Haven and Hartford Railroad precursors

References 

Predecessors of the New York, New Haven and Hartford Railroad
Defunct Connecticut railroads
Railway companies established in 1833
Railway companies disestablished in 1872
Defunct Massachusetts railroads
Railway lines opened in 1844
American companies established in 1833
American companies disestablished in 1872